Ascalapha is a genus of moths in the family Erebidae. The genus was erected by Jacob Hübner in 1809.

Species
 Ascalapha odorata (Linnaeus, 1758) – black witch

References

Thermesiini
Monotypic moth genera